Phillip McCallen (born Portadown, Armagh) is a Northern Ireland born former motorcycle racer, now turned to dealer in his retirement from road racing.

McCallen is joint eighth in the list of all-time Isle of Man TT winners, with 11 race victories, including four races in one week in 1996; a tally which stood unbroken until 2010, when Ian Hutchinson won five races in a week. McCallen also won 5 wins from 6 starts at the 1992 North West 200, and 5 wins in one day at the 1996 Ulster Grand Prix.

Biography
McCallen was born within yards of the Tandragee road racing circuit.

Isle of Man TT
McCallen is joint eighth in the list of all-time Isle of Man TT winners, with 11 race victories to his name. His first race was in 1988 at the Manx Grand Prix, the amateur equivalent of the TT. The 1996 Isle of Man TT was the year where McCallen riding a Honda achieved four wins in a week, winning all of the main races with Jim Moodie and Joey Dunlop picking up the smaller bike wins.

Later career
McCallen rode his entire career for Honda (except the last TT in 1999, when he signed up with Yamaha), and during his career was employed working on research and development in conjunction with Honda. In the later stages of his career, McCallen became general after sales manager for one of the UK's leading motorcycle retailers. McCallen now owns a successful motorcycle dealership in Lisburn, specialising in Triumph, Kawasaki and KTM bikes.

Records
Tied seventh in the list of all-time Isle of Man TT winners, with 11 race victories
Held the lap record at Olivers Mount, the Scarborough, North Yorkshire venue for the annual Auto66 club event, from 1994 until 2004. It was broken by Guy Martin

References

External links
McCallen's own motorcycle dealership
McCallen on the challenge of the Isle of Man TT

Complete TT record

Year of birth missing (living people)
Living people
People from Portadown
Motorcycle racers from Northern Ireland
Isle of Man TT riders